Geladze is a Georgian surname. Notable people with the surname include:

 Aleksandre Geladze (born 1972), Georgian footballer
 Keke Geladze (1858–1937), mother of Joseph Stalin

Georgian-language surnames